Beaubier is a hamlet in the Canadian province of Saskatchewan. The community was renamed Beaubier to honour a young schoolteacher who died nursing the ill during the 1918 Spanish flu pandemic.

Demographics 

See also 
List of communities in Saskatchewan
List of hamlets in Saskatchewan

References 

Designated places in Saskatchewan
Lake Alma No. 8, Saskatchewan
Organized hamlets in Saskatchewan
Division No. 2, Saskatchewan